Henry Thuillier may refer to:

 Henry Ravenshaw Thuillier (1838–1922), Surveyor General of India
 Henry Fleetwood Thuillier (1868–1953), British Army officer
 Henry Shakespear Thuillier (1895–1982), British Army officer